Tere Ishq Nachaya (translation: Your love made me dance) is a Punjabi Sufi song composed by 18th-century mystic-poet Baba Bulle Shah. It is a popular song performed by Sufi and qawwali singers, including Abida Parveen and also featured in Sufi music album, Sufi –Ishq Bada Bedardi (RPG Sa Re Ga Ma) .

It has also been performed by Punjabi folk singer Jasbir Jassi and pop rock band, Jal, who also performed it on the episode 1 of Coke Studio in 2011.

This song inspired the 1998 Cult-classical hit Chaiyya Chaiyya, written by Gulzar, music by A R Rahman and sung by Sukhwinder Singh and Sapna Awasthi from Mani Ratnam's Dil Se film.

In the early 2000s, Shoaib Mansoor directed a very popular variant of this song called "Supreme Ishq" which was sung by Riaz Ali Qadri.

References

External links
Punjabi Songs

Qawwali songs
Pakistani folk songs
Punjabi-language songs
18th-century songs